Ceratophyllus orites is a species of flea in the family Ceratophyllidae. It was described by Karl Jordan in 1937.

References 

Ceratophyllidae
Insects described in 1937